Shakhawat Hossain (born 8 October 1998) is a Bangladeshi cricketer. He made his first-class debut for Chittagong Division in the 2017–18 National Cricket League on 15 September 2017. He made his List A debut for Brothers Union in the 2017–18 Dhaka Premier Division Cricket League on 28 February 2018. He made his Twenty20 debut for Brothers Union in the 2018–19 Dhaka Premier Division Twenty20 Cricket League on 25 February 2019.

References

External links
 

1999 births
Living people
Bangladeshi cricketers
Brothers Union cricketers
Chittagong Division cricketers
People from Chittagong